WPJW (91.5 FM, "WALK FM") is a radio station broadcasting a Contemporary Christian music format. One of the 7 "WALK FM" network of stations. Licensed to Hurricane, West Virginia, United States, the station is currently owned by Positive Alternative Radio, Inc.

References

External links
 
 

PJW
Radio stations established in 1975